Emory Peak, located in Big Bend National Park, is the highest peak in the Chisos Mountains and the highest in Brewster County. The peak is named for William H. Emory, the chief surveyor of the U.S. Boundary Survey team of 1852. From the Chisos Basin the peak appears to be a minor ridge, while the summit of Casa Grande, one mile closer, seems to be much taller. From the west, Emory Peak is clearly visible as a point slightly higher than most of the mountain range.

The trail is reached by climbing the Pinnacles Trail  from the Chisos Basin trailhead. Once at the base there is a semi-technical rock scramble to navigate before reaching the summit. No gear is needed for this climb although hikers should take great care. High-desert flora and fauna including alligator juniper (Juniperus deppeana), pinyon pine (Pinus cembroides), mule deer (Odocoileus hemionus), prickly pear cacti (Opuntia spp.), Mexican jay (Aphelocoma wollweberi), sotol (Dasylirion leiophyllum), and Texas madrone (Arbutus xalapensis) may be seen along the trail. There are signs warning of mountain lions and bears.

The view from the top takes in most of the northern section of the park and a good portion of the Chisos range to the south. One surprise at the top, during the right season, is the population of lady bugs on the summit.  There are solar panels, radio transmission equipment, and antennae at the top.

See also

Chihuahuan Desert
Guadalupe Peak

References

External links

Mountains of Texas
Highest points of United States national parks
Landforms of Brewster County, Texas
Big Bend National Park